is a Japanese manga series both written and illustrated by Itokatsu. The series is currently serialized in Manga Action, while being published by Futabasha and has collected 8 volumes since April 2012. Crunchyroll is simulpublishing the chapters in English as they are published in Japan.

Characters

A young girl from Finland who moved to Japan in order to become an Akiba Idol.

Nina's uncle who lost his job in Tokyo and therefore moved back home to live with his family in Tsumagoi, Gunma.

Media

Manga
The manga is serialized in the Japanese manga magazine Manga Action published by Futabasha starting in 2012. Futabasha has compiled the chapters into 8 volumes so far starting from April 17, 2012.

Volume list

References

Futabasha manga
Seinen manga